The 2013–14 1. FC Union Berlin season is the club's fifth consecutive season in the 2. Bundesliga.

Background

Union Berlin won the 2008–09 3. Liga. Since promotion, Union Berlin has finished 12th in 2009–10, 11th in 2010–11, and seventh in 2011–12 and 2012–13.

Transfers

In

Out

Competitions

2. Bundesliga

Union Berlin's season started on 21 July with a 2–1 loss to VfL Bochum. Damir Kreilach scored for Union Berlin and Danny Latza and Marcel Maltritz scored for Bochum.

League table

Matches

DFB–Pokal

The draw for the first round of the DFB-Pokal happened on 15 June. Union Berlin were drawn against Jahn Regensburg. The match took place on 5 August and ended up as a 2–1 win for Union Berlin. Sören Brandy and Benjamin Köhler scored for Union Berlin and Abdenour Amachaibou scored for Jahn Regensburg. Union Berlin were drawn against VfL Osnabrück on 10 August for the second round. The match took place on 25 September and ended up as a 1–0 win for Union Berlin. Torsten Mattuschka scored the only goal of the match. Union Berlin were drawn against 1. FC Kaiserslautern for the round of 16 on 29 September. The match took place on 3 December with Kaiserslautern winning 3–0 with goals from Willi Orban, Simon Zoller, and Marcel Gaus.

Matches

Team record

Notes

1.Kickoff time in Central European Time/Central European Summer Time.
2.Union Berlin goals listed first.

References

Union Berlin
1. FC Union Berlin seasons